Giulio Gavotti (17 October 1882 in Genoa–6 October 1939) was an Italian lieutenant and pilot who fought in the Italo-Turkish War.

Aerial bombardment
On 1 November 1911, he flew his early model Etrich Taube monoplane against Ottoman military in Libya. He took four grenades ("Cipelli") in a leather pouch, each of a size of grapefruit and weighing about four pounds. Flying at an altitude of 600 feet, Gavotti screwed in the detonators and tossed each munition over the side—three onto the Tagiura (Jagiura) oasis and one more onto military camp at Ain Zara. This event is the first recorded airstrike launched from an airplane.

After this and further missions, the Ottoman Empire issued a protest. The dropping of bombs from balloons had been outlawed by the Hague Convention of 1899, but Italy argued that this ban did not extend to heavier-than-air craft.

The oldest known preserved Etrich Taube, in Vienna, Austria, is possibly a near-twin to the aircraft Gavotti flew in 1911, as both are said to have been powered with inline four-cylinder liquid-cooled powerplants.

Night mission
Gavotti performed the historically first night mission of a heavier-than-air aircraft. It took place as part of the same campaign in Libya on 4 March 1912.

See also
 1911 in aviation
 Aerial bomb
 Bomber
 Tactical bombing

Notes

1882 births
1939 deaths
Military personnel from Genoa
Italian Air Force personnel
Italian military personnel of the Italo-Turkish War
Aviation pioneers